Peter Cathcart Wason (22 April 1924 – 17 April 2003) was a cognitive psychologist at University College, London who pioneered the Psychology of Reasoning. He progressed explanations as to why people make certain consistent mistakes in logical reasoning. He designed problems and tests to demonstrate these processes, for example the Wason selection task, the THOG problem and the 2-4-6 problem. He also coined the term "confirmation bias" to describe the tendency for people to immediately favor information that validates their preconceptions, hypotheses and personal beliefs regardless of whether they are true or not.

Personal life
Wason was born in Bath Somerset on 22 April 1924, and died at seventy-nine in Wallingford, Oxfordshire on 17 April 2003. Peter Wason was the grandson to Eugene Wason, and the son to Eugene Monier and Kathleen (Woodhouse) Wason. Wason married Marjorie Vera Salberg in 1951, and the couple had two children, Armorer and Sarah. His uncle was Lieutenant General Sydney Rigby Wason.

Peter Wason endured his schooling, which was marked by consistent failure. With the beginning of World War II, Wason completed officer training at Sandhurst, and then served as a liaison officer for the 8th Armoured Brigade, by then an independent brigade. Wason returned home in 1945, having been released from his duties of being an officer due to extreme injuries. Wason then pursued more academic ventures by studying English at Oxford in 1948, and continued on to become a lecturer at the University of Aberdeen. After the realization that he did not really prefer English, and actually found it quite boring, Wason returned to Oxford University to obtain a master's degree in psychology in 1953, and then a doctorate in 1956 from University College London. He remained teaching at University College London until his retirement in the early 1980s.

Early studies
Much of Peter Wason’s first areas of experimentation was not in the field of psychology of reasoning, but instead, language and psycholinguistics. Wason and Jones performed an experiment in which subjects were asked to evaluate numerical statements, such as “7 is even” and “9 is not odd”, and state whether the statement is true or false. The results revealed that affirmative assertions were evaluated faster as true than as false, but evaluation of negative assertions occurred faster as false than true. From these results, Wason came to the conclusion that negatives are used in daily lives and discourse to correct common misconceptions. An example of this usage would be “The chair is not here”. Wason continued to explore and experiment in the field of psycholinguistics.  Alongside Susan Carey at the Harvard Center for Cognitive Studies, Wason found that context affects comprehension of an utterance, measured in time taken to respond. Participants were likely to respond more quickly to the statement “Circle number 4 is not blue” in a context in which all of the other circles were red.  Wason came to the conclusion context affects comprehension.

The Beginning of the Psychology of Reasoning
Before the creation of psychology of reasoning, it was a commonly held belief that humans reasoned by logical analysis. Wason argued against this logicism, saying that humans are unable to reason, and quite frequently fall prey to biases. Wason thought many of the things in his life were inconsistent and therefore unreasonable. When he designed his experiments, Wason's goal was to examine the illogical nature of humans. Wason also wanted to look further into the confirmation bias, the tendency to strive toward proving one’s hypothesis instead of disproving it.

Wason and the 2-4-6 Task
In 1960 Wason developed the first of many tasks he would devise to reveal the failures of human reasoning. The “2-4-6” task was the first experiment that showed people to be illogical and irrational. In this study, subjects were told that the experimenter had a rule in mind that only applied to sets of threes. The “2-4-6” rule the experimenter had in mind was “any ascending sequence”. In most cases, subjects not only formed hypotheses that were more specific than necessary, but they also only tested positive examples of their hypothesis. Wason was surprised by the large number of subjects who failed to get the task correct. The subjects failed to test instances inconsistent with their own hypothesis, which further supported Wason’s hypothesis of confirmation bias.

The Four-Card Task
Wason created the Selection Task, also known as the 4-card task, in 1966. In this task, participants were exposed to four cards on a table, and given a rule by the experimenter. The participants were then told to choose just cards to determine whether the rule given to them by the experimenter was true or false. As Wason expected, a majority of participants failed to answer the question correctly. Only ten percent of participants solved this task correctly.  The confirmation bias played a large part in this result, as participants usually chose cards to confirm their hypothesis, instead of eliminating it.

THOG Task

Wason devised yet another task, called the THOG task, to further his studies in psychology of reasoning. In this task, participants were shown cards with a white diamond, a black diamond, a white circle, and a black circle. They were then given a rule, and instructed to choose which of the cards would be a THOG, which were not, and which could not be classified. The THOG task required subjects to carry out a combinational analysis, a feat an adult should be able to accomplish, using reason and logic. That being said, half of the participants answered the problem incorrectly.

Approach to experimentation
Peter Wason took a rather unconventional approach to his studies. When running experiments, he took a more active approach. Although he had some lab aides, he insisted on being present when experiments were run, so he could actively watch the subjects’ behavior throughout the process. It is also said that Wason infused a clinical psychology atmosphere into his study by asking his subjects how they felt about the experiment itself, as well as the results delivered. These evaluations were recorded and placed in his papers, giving them a more personal and unique feel than many other academic papers of the time. Wason’s goal was to discover new psychological phenomena and new aspects of human behavior, and not only to test his own hypotheses.

Publications
Wason wrote the following books:
 Thinking and Reasoning, (co-edited with P N Johnson-Laird, 1968)
 Psychology of Reasoning: Structure and Content, (with P N Johnson-Laird, 1972)
 Thinking: Readings in Cognitive Science, (co-edited with P N Johnson-Laird, 1977)
 The Psychology of Chess, (with William Hartston, 1983).

References

1924 births
2003 deaths
English psychologists
Academics of University College London
Alumni of University College London
20th-century psychologists
Burials at Highgate Cemetery
People from Bath, Somerset
British Army personnel of World War II
Graduates of the Royal Military College, Sandhurst
Royal Armoured Corps officers
British Army officers
English people of Scottish descent
Academics of the University of Aberdeen
Alumni of the University of Oxford